The Union-Recorder is a daily newspaper published Tuesday - Saturday in Milledgeville, Georgia. It is owned by Community Newspaper Holdings Inc., who purchased it from Knight Ridder in 1997.

References

External links 
 The Union-Recorder Website
 CNHI Website
 Milledgeville Historic Newspapers Archive Digital Library of Georgia

Newspapers published in Georgia (U.S. state)
Baldwin County, Georgia
Newspapers established in 1820
1820 establishments in Georgia (U.S. state)